Giorgio Cecchinel (born 24 June 1989) is an Italian former professional racing cyclist. He raced in the 2014 Giro d'Italia, but did not start stage 6 due to illness.

References

External links
 

1989 births
Living people
Italian male cyclists
Cyclists from the Province of Treviso